Lord and Lady Algy is a comedy play by the British writer R. C. Carton which premiered in London in 1898, starring his wife, Katherine Compton, and Charles Hawtrey. In New York it played at the Empire Theatre in May 1899, running for 111 performances, and was revived on Broadway later in 1899, 1903 and 1917.

Film adaptation
In 1919 the play was turned into an American silent film of the same title directed by Harry Beaumont.

References

Sources
 Goble, Alan. The Complete Index to Literary Sources in Film. Walter de Gruyter, 1999. 

1898 plays
British plays adapted into films
Plays set in England
Plays by R. C. Carton